The discography of London-based alternative rock band Drugstore consists of four studio albums, two compilation albums and 21 singles. Drugstore released their debut single "Alive" in 1993, and the same year they released the "Modern Pleasures" single. After various single released from 1994 to 1995, they released their debut self-titled album in 1995. The album peaked  in the UK Albums Chart at number 31, the single "Fader", taken from the album, followed and went at number 70 in the UK Singles Chart. They released their second album White Magic for Lovers in 1998, which was a moderate success going to 45 in the UK Albums Chart, and it landed them the top 20 single "El President". The single "Sober" followed and went at number 68. In 2000 they released the single "Dry", and the year after they released their third album Songs for the Jet Set, however they went on a hiatus so little promotion was done. After an eight-year hiatus, they reformed and released their fourth album Anatomy in 2011 through Rocket Girl. In September they released the Best of Drugstore album, and are working on a fifth album with a working title of A Stroll Beyond the Cave and Into the Light, planned to be released in 2014.

Albums

Studio albums

Compilation albums 
 Collector Number One (2002)
 Best of Drugstore (2013)

Singles 
1993
 "Alive"
 "Modern Pleasures"

1994
 "Starcrossed"
 "Driving"

1995
 "Solitary Party Groover"
 "Injection"
 "Nectarine"
 "Fader" (UK Singles Chart #70)
 "Xmas at the Drugstore"

1996
 "Mondo Cane"

1998
 "El President"
 "Sober"
 "Say Hello"

2000
 "Dry"
 "I Wanna Love You Like a Man"

2001
 "Song for the Lonely"
 "Baby Don't Hurt Yourself"

2011
 "Sweet Chili Girl/Clouds"
 "Standing Still"

2012
 "Aquamarine"

References 

Discographies of British artists